Scythocentropus is a genus of moths of the family Noctuidae.

Species
 Scythocentropus eberti Hacker, 2001
 Scythocentropus inquinata (Mabille, 1888)
 Scythocentropus misella (Püngeler, 1908)
 Scythocentropus scripturosa (Eversmann, 1854)
 Scythocentropus singalesia (Hampson, 1918)

References

External links
Natural History Museum Lepidoptera genus database
Scythocentropus at funet

Hadeninae